Fisher Island is a census-designated place in Miami-Dade County, Florida, United States, located on a barrier island of the same name. Since 2015, Fisher Island has the highest per capita income of any place in the United States. As of the 2020 census, the population was 561.

Named for automotive parts pioneer and beach real estate developer Carl G. Fisher, who once owned it, Fisher Island is three miles off the shore of mainland South Florida. No road or causeway connects to the island, which is only accessible by private boat, helicopter, or ferry. Once a one-family island home of the Vanderbilts, and later several other millionaires, it was sold for development in the 1960s. The property sat vacant for well over 15 years before development began for very limited and restrictive multi-family use.

History
Fisher Island was separated from the barrier island which became Miami Beach in 1905, when Government Cut was dredged across the northern end of the island. Construction of Fisher Island began in 1919 when Carl G. Fisher, a land developer, purchased the property from businessman and real estate developer Dana A. Dorsey, southern Florida's first African-American millionaire. In 1925 William Kissam Vanderbilt II traded a luxury yacht to Fisher for ownership of the island.

After Vanderbilt's death in 1944, ownership of the island passed to U.S. Steel heir Edward Moore. Moore died in the early 1950s, and Gar Wood, the millionaire inventor of hydraulic construction equipment, bought it. Wood, a speedboat enthusiast, kept the island a one-family retreat. In 1963, Wood sold to a development group that included local Key Biscayne millionaire Bebe Rebozo, Miami native and United States Senator George Smathers, and then former U.S. Vice President Richard Nixon, who had promised to leave politics. During his subsequent presidency from 1968 to 1973, and during the Watergate scandal, Nixon maintained a home on nearby Key Biscayne known as the "Key Biscayne Whitehouse" that was the former residence of Senator Smathers and next door to Rebozo, but none of the three ever resided on Fisher Island.

The Rosenstiel School of Marine and Atmospheric Science (RSMAS) of the University of Miami maintained the Comparative Sedimentology Laboratory on Fisher Island from 1972 to 1990 under the leadership of Robert Ginsburg.

After years of legal battles and changes in ownership, further development on the island was finally started in the 1980s, with architecture matching the original 1920s Spanish style mansions. Although no longer a one-family island, in 2005, Fisher Island still remains somewhat inaccessible to the public and uninvited guests, and is as exclusive by modern standards as it was in the days of the Vanderbilts, providing similar refuge and retreat for its residents. The island contains mansions, a hotel, several apartment buildings, an observatory, and a private marina. Boris Becker, Oprah Winfrey, and Mel Brooks are among the celebrities with homes on the island.

In 2005, the island attempted to incorporate as a town, but the Miami-Dade County Commission did not support this initiative.

Controversies
In 2006, the Service Employees International Union  began organizing the workers on Fisher Island in preparation for a petition for recognition as those employees' bargaining representative. The campaign culminated on June 15, 2007, with a march to the mainland ferry terminal that ended with a worker's arrest. The New York Times wrote an exposé on the situation. In the article, residents were portrayed as not caring about the welfare of the community, but residents disputed this characterization, insisting that the island included financially successful, compassionate people who had established several charitable activities on the island, provided health insurance to their employees and were involved in various arts organizations in the Miami-Dade area. The union argued that the wages provided by the island were too low for employees to care for their families and that the health insurance provided was out of the reach of most island employees.

The Fisher Island bankruptcy case
One of the last developable parcels of land on the island, a  site approved for residential development facing the shipping channel that separates the island from Miami Beach, was for a number of years subject to a protracted legal battle between Inna Gudavadze, the widow of the late Georgian billionaire Badri Patarkatsishvili, and investors aligned with his distant relative and former business associate, Joseph Kay.

A judgment handed down by the United States District Court for the Southern District of Florida on October 16, 2013, upheld in the US a previous 2010 judgement from the Supreme Court of Gibraltar that comprehensively dismissed the "wholly unconvincing" case brought by Joseph Kay. The development then moved forward, under the supervision of Inna Gudavadze and the Patarkatsishvili family.

Geography
It is bordered to the north, across Government Cut, by the city of Miami Beach, and to the south, across Norris Cut, by Virginia Key, within the Miami city limits. Biscayne Bay is to the west, and the Atlantic Ocean is to the east.

Demographics

2020 census

As of the 2020 United States census, there were 561 people, 197 households, and 135 families residing in the CDP.

2000 census
As of the census of 2000, there were 467 people, 218 households, and 149 families residing in the CDP. The racial makeup of the CDP was 92.08% White (77.9% were Non-Hispanic White,) 3.21% African American, 2.14% Asian, 0.64% from other races, and 1.93% from two or more races. Hispanic or Latino people of any race were 14.8% of the population.

There were 218 households, out of which 19.3% had children under the age of 18 living with them, 61.5% were married couples living together, 5.5% had a female householder with no husband present, and 31.2% were non-families. 26.6% of all households were made up of individuals, and 7.3% had someone living alone who was 65 years of age or older.  The average household size was 2.14 and the average family size was 2.51.

In the CDP, the population was spread out, with 15.6% under the age of 18, 3.2% from 18 to 24, 20.3% from 25 to 44, 45.6% from 45 to 64, and 15.2% who were 65 years of age or older.  The median age was 51 years. For every 100 females, there were 101.3 males.  For every 100 females age 18 and over, there were 99.0 males.

The median income for a household in the CDP was in excess of $200,000, as was the median income for a family. Males had a median income of over $100,000 versus $85,789 for females. The per capita income for the CDP was $236,238.  None of the population or families are below the poverty line.

As of 2000, English was the first language for 84.61% of all residents, while Spanish was the first language for 15.38% of the population.

In April 2018, Bloomberg reported that the average income for Fisher Island was $2.5 million in 2015, according to a Bloomberg analysis of 2015 Internal Revenue Service data. This makes Fisher Island's zip code the wealthiest in the United States.

Education
The island has a private school, Fisher Island Day School, which includes preschool through eighth grade for both on-island and off-island residents. The school was founded by Lexie and Robert Potamkin and Valerie and Michael Pearce in 2001.  Approximately 30% of the students come from off-island, predominantly from the nearby Miami and Miami Beach neighborhoods of Star Island, Hibiscus Island, Palm Island, the Venetian Islands, Bayshore, South Beach, Pinecrest, Coral Gables, and Coconut Grove.

The island is served by Miami-Dade County Public Schools. It is zoned for South Pointe Elementary School, Nautilus Middle School, Miami Beach Senior High School.

Notable current and former residents

Andre Agassi (seasonal resident)
Barbara Becker
Boris Becker
Pavel Bure
Bharat Desai
Harold Ford Sr. (part-time resident)
Susana Giménez (seasonal resident)
Sharon Gless
Sergei Gonchar
Burke Henry 
Robert Herjavec (seasonal resident)
Ilya Kovalchuk (seasonal resident)
Igor Krutoy
Karolina Kurkova
Evgeni Malkin
Barney Rosenzweig
Oprah Winfrey
Caroline Wozniacki
Martin Zweig

See also

 Barrier island
 List of islands

References

 Fisher Island (island) and Fisher Island CDP, FL Demographic and Housing Data 2010, Miami-Dade County Planning and Zoning, Florida

External links

 Fisher Island Club (private luxury community)
 Fisher Island Day School
 

Census-designated places in Miami-Dade County, Florida
Miami Beach, Florida
Census-designated places in Florida
Populated coastal places in Florida on the Atlantic Ocean
Planned communities in Florida
1905 establishments in Florida